Palm civet is the common name of several species of feliform carnivorans in two families.

Family Viverridae:
Small-toothed palm civet (Arctogalidia trivirgata)
Owston's palm civet (Chrotogale owstoni)
Hose's palm civet (Diplogale hosei)
Banded palm civet (Hemigalus derbyanus)
Sulawesi palm civet (Macrogalidia musschenbroekii)
Masked palm civet (Paguma larvata)
Asian palm civet (Paradoxurus hermaphroditus)
Golden palm civet (Paradoxurus zeylonensis)
Brown palm civet (Paradoxurus jerdoni)

Family Nandiniidae:
African palm civet (Nandinia binotata)

Feliforms
Mammal common names